Bobadilla del Campo is a municipality in the province of Valladolid, Castile and León, Spain.

According to the 2004 census (INE), the municipality had a population of 385 inhabitants.

References

Municipalities in the Province of Valladolid